Peter or Pete Jacobs may refer to:
Peter Jacobs (fencer) (born 1938), British fencer
Peter Jacobs (lacrosse) (born 1973), former lacrosse player
Peter Jacobs (landscape architect) (born 1939), Canadian landscape architect
Pete Jacobs (musician) (1899–c. 1952), American jazz drummer
 Peter Jacobs (pianist) (born 1945), English pianist
Pete Jacobs (triathlete) (born 1981), Australian triathlete

See also
Pieter Jacobs (born 1986), Belgian cyclist
Pieter Jacobs (playwright) (born 1980), South African playwright